The Folklands (Folklanden) is the name for the original Swedish provinces of Tiundaland, Attundaland, Fjärdhundraland, and Roden (Roslagen) which in the 1296 united to form the province of Uppland. They were originally united by electing a common king who administered the sacrifices at Uppsala and who was the commander of the leidang during wars. It is not known when they united for the first time, but already in 98 AD, Tacitus described the Suiones as a powerful tribe.

Modern usage 
The term Folkland, in the transferred sense of originally independent subprovinces, has by modern historians also been used to refer to the similar traditional provinces of the areas which later became the unified provinces of Hälsingland and Småland.

See also
Petty kingdom
Stone of Mora

Medieval Sweden